Chornovil or Chornovol (Чорновол) is a Ukrainian surname. Notable people with the surname include:

 Andriy Chornovil (born 1962), Ukrainian politician
 Taras Chornovil (born 1964), Ukrainian politician
 Tetiana Chornovol (born 1979), Ukrainian journalist and civic activist
 Viacheslav Chornovil (1937–1999), Ukrainian politician

See also
 

Ukrainian-language surnames